Georg Grünenfelder (born 2 January 1937) is a Swiss alpine skier. He competed in the men's downhill at the 1964 Winter Olympics.

References

1937 births
Living people
Swiss male alpine skiers
Olympic alpine skiers of Switzerland
Alpine skiers at the 1964 Winter Olympics